Tom Hoge (born May 25, 1989) is an American professional golfer on the PGA Tour.

Amateur career
Born in Statesville, North Carolina, Hoge was raised and still resides in Fargo, North Dakota. After graduating from Fargo South High School in 2007, he played college golf at Texas Christian University, where he won two events. Hoge tied for third in the individual portion of the 2009 NCAA Championship, and also won several North Dakota and Minnesota amateur titles.

Professional career

Hoge turned professional after graduating from college in 2011, initially on the Canadian Tour, where he won that year's Canadian Tour Players Cup. He played on the Web.com Tour from 2012 through 2014; his best finishes were a pair of second-place finishes at the 2013 BMW Charity Pro-Am and the Nationwide Children's Hospital Championship in September 2015.

Hoge has played on the PGA Tour since 2015; that August, he co-led after 36-holes (with Tiger Woods) at the Wyndham Championship. His first 54-hole lead was at the Sony Open in Hawaii in January 2018, where he climbed from second after 36 holes, but shot par in the final round and finished a stroke back in third place.

In his 203rd start on the PGA Tour, Hoge gained his first victory in February 2022 at the AT&T Pebble Beach Pro-Am. He shot a final round 68 for 268 (–19), two strokes ahead of runner-up Jordan Spieth.

In March 2023, Hoge made the cut at the Players Championship on the number, then set a tournament record by shooting a 10-under 62 in the third round.

Amateur wins
2006 North Dakota Stroke Play Championship
2007 North Dakota Match Play Championship
2008 North Dakota Match Play Championship, Columbia Invitational
2009 Minnesota State Amateur
2010 Minnesota State Amateur
2011 Morris Williams Intercollegiate

Source:

Professional wins (4)

PGA Tour wins (1)

Canadian Tour wins (1)

Other wins (2)

Source:

Results in major championships
Results not in chronological order in 2020.

CUT = missed the half-way cut
"T" indicates a tie for a place
NT = No tournament due to COVID-19 pandemic

Results in The Players Championship

"T" indicates a tie for a place
C = Canceled after the first round due to the COVID-19 pandemic

Results in World Golf Championships

1Canceled due to the COVID-19 pandemic

"T" = Tied
NT = No tournament

See also
2014 Web.com Tour Finals graduates
2015 Web.com Tour Finals graduates
2017 Web.com Tour Finals graduates
2019 Korn Ferry Tour Finals graduates

References

External links
 
 

American male golfers
TCU Horned Frogs men's golfers
PGA Tour golfers
Korn Ferry Tour graduates
Golfers from North Carolina
Golfers from North Dakota
People from Statesville, North Carolina
Sportspeople from Fargo, North Dakota
1989 births
Living people